Lutz Trümper (born 1 October 1955) is a German politician for the Social Democratic Party of Germany (SPD) and Lord mayor of the city of Magdeburg.

Biography

Trümper was born 1955 in Oschersleben and became a teacher for chemistry and biology.
Since 2001 he is lord mayor of Magdeburg. In the European migration crisis he was a sharp critic of the policy of his party SPD and left the party for some while.

References

1955 births
Living people
Social Democratic Party of Germany politicians
Mayors of places in Saxony-Anhalt